Ma Qing (born 24 August 1992) is a Chinese female canoeist. She competed in the women's K-2 500 metres event at the 2016 Summer Olympics. She qualified in the  women's K-1 200 metres, and women's K-1 500 metres events at the 2020 Summer Olympics.

References

External links
 
 
 

1992 births
Living people
Sportspeople from Zibo
Canoeists from Shandong
Chinese female canoeists
Olympic canoeists of China
Canoeists at the 2016 Summer Olympics
Canoeists at the 2020 Summer Olympics
Asian Games gold medalists for China
Asian Games silver medalists for China
Asian Games medalists in canoeing
Canoeists at the 2014 Asian Games
Canoeists at the 2018 Asian Games
Medalists at the 2014 Asian Games
Medalists at the 2018 Asian Games